Anjunadeep In Ibiza 2010 is a digital album compiled by British trance group Above & Beyond, released on 24 August 2010 on Anjunadeep, the sub-label of Anjunabeats.

Track listing

References

   

Electronic compilation albums
2010 compilation albums
Above & Beyond (band) albums